Eszter Hargittai (born 1973 in Budapest, Hungary) is a communication studies scholar and Professor at the University of Zurich.

Biography
She holds a BA in Sociology from Smith College and a PhD in Sociology from Princeton University where she was a Wilson Scholar.

Before moving to Zurich, she was Delaney Family Professor of Communication Studies and Faculty Associate of the Institute for Policy Research (IPR) at Northwestern University where she is still affiliated as Adjunct Professor and Fellow at IPR.

She was a fellow at the Center for Advanced Study in the Behavioral Sciences at Stanford (2006–2007), a fellow at the Institute for International Integration Studies, Trinity College Dublin (2007), and a fellow at Harvard's Berkman Klein Center for Internet & Society (2008–09) where she was on the Faculty Advisory Board until 2020. She has been a member of the group blog Crooked Timber since 2003.

Her research focuses on the social and policy implications of information technologies with a particular interest in how IT may contribute to or alleviate social inequalities. She has studied the differences in people's Web-use skills, the evolution of search engines  and the organization and presentation of online content, political uses of information technologies, how IT are influencing the types of cultural products people consume, and geocaching.

Her work is regularly featured in the media. Her work on the international spread of the Internet was referenced by Wired News
 and cited in a United States Senate hearing. Other coverage includes BBC News as well as the Chicago Tribune  The Washington Post, The Wall Street Journal  and
several other publications.

Notable publications

References

Sources
 List of publications that have printed Eszter Hargittai

External links
 Eszter Hargittai's Home Page
 Survey Measures of Web-Oriented Digital Literacy
 Eszter Hargittai's Blog
 Web Use Project
 Works by Eszter Hargittai

1973 births
Living people
American sociologists
American women sociologists
Smith College alumni
Princeton University alumni
Berkman Fellows
Northwestern University faculty
American bloggers
Center for Advanced Study in the Behavioral Sciences fellows
Academic staff of the University of Zurich
21st-century American women